The 2020–21 A-League was the 44th season of national level soccer in Australia, and the 16th since the establishment of the A-League in 2004. The season was started on 28 December 2020 and concluded with the Grand Final on 27 June 2021. The start of the season was later than previous seasons as a result of both the COVID-19 pandemic in Australia and New Zealand, and as part of a gradual shift to move the competition from summer to winter. Wellington Phoenix played the majority of their home matches at Wollongong Showground in Wollongong due to international travel restrictions.

Sydney FC were the defending champions and premiers, having won their record fifth and fourth titles respectively the previous season. Melbourne City won their first premiership and championship title, leaving Sydney FC in second on both.

Clubs 

There were 12 clubs participating in this season. Macarthur FC made their A-League debut this season.

Personnel and kits

Managerial changes

Foreign players 

The following do not fill a Visa position:
1Those players who were born and started their professional career abroad but have since gained Australian citizenship (or New Zealand citizenship, in the case of Wellington Phoenix);
2Australian citizens (or New Zealand citizens, in the case of Wellington Phoenix) who have chosen to represent another national team;
3Injury replacement players, or National team replacement players;
4Guest players (eligible to play a maximum of fourteen games)

Salary cap exemptions and captains

Transfers

Regular season
The regular season commenced on 28 December 2020 and ended on 10 June 2021.

League table

Fixtures and results

Finals series

Elimination-finals

Semi-finals

Grand Final

Statistics

Top scorers 
Including Finals matches

Hat-tricks

Awards

Annual awards
The following end of the season awards were announced at the 2020–21 Dolan Warren Awards night on 23 June 2021.
 Johnny Warren Medal – Ulises Dávila, Wellington Phoenix & Miloš Ninković, Sydney FC
 NAB Young Footballer of the Year – Joel King, Sydney FC
 Nike Golden Boot Award – Jamie Maclaren, Melbourne City (25 goals)
 Goalkeeper of the Year – Mark Birighitti, Central Coast Mariners & Andrew Redmayne, Sydney FC
 Coach of the Year – Patrick Kisnorbo, Melbourne City
 Fair Play Award – Brisbane Roar
 Referee of the Year – Chris Beath
 Goal of the Year – Andy Keogh, Perth Glory (Perth Glory v Western Sydney Wanderers, 16 May 2021)

Team of the season

See also

 2020–21 Adelaide United FC season
 2020–21 Brisbane Roar FC season
 2020–21 Central Coast Mariners FC season
 2020–21 Macarthur FC season
 2020–21 Melbourne City FC season
 2020–21 Melbourne Victory FC season
 2020–21 Newcastle Jets FC season
 2020–21 Perth Glory FC season
 2020–21 Sydney FC season
 2020–21 Wellington Phoenix FC season
 2020–21 Western Sydney Wanderers FC season
 2020–21 Western United FC season

References

 
1
1
A-League
A League, 2021
A-League Men seasons